John Moses Barlow (May 17, 1833 – April 29, 1903) was an American businessman and politician.

Barlow was born in Lee, Massachusetts and went to the Lee public schools. In 1851, Barlow moved to East Troy, Wisconsin and was involved in the mercantile business. He also lived in Medina, New York and Mukwonago, Wisconsin. In 1870, Barlow settled in New Lisbon, Wisconsin. He was involved in the mercantile business in New Lisbon. Barlow served on the New Lisbon Village Board and as village president. He served on the Juneau County Board of Supervisors and was chairman of the county board. Barlow served in the Wisconsin Assembly from 1899 to 1903 and was a Republican. Barlow died from cancer of the stomach in New Lisbon, Wisconsin.

Notes

External links

1833 births
1903 deaths
People from Lee, Massachusetts
People from New Lisbon, Wisconsin
Businesspeople from Wisconsin
Wisconsin city council members
Mayors of places in Wisconsin
County supervisors in Wisconsin
Republican Party members of the Wisconsin State Assembly
Deaths from stomach cancer
Deaths from cancer in Wisconsin
People from East Troy, Wisconsin
19th-century American politicians
19th-century American businesspeople